Hans Riiberg (also Hans Riberg; 1871 Luiste Parish (now Märjamaa Parish), Kreis Wiek - ?) was an Estonian politician. He was a member of Estonian Provincial Assembly.

References

1871 births
Year of death missing
People from Märjamaa Parish
People from Kreis Wiek
Members of the Estonian Provincial Assembly